Priscilla McClure Paetsch (née Johnson), (November 18, 1931 – July 19, 2017), was an American violinist, composer, artist, sculptor, horse trainer, and co-founder of the Paetsch Family Chamber Music Ensemble in Colorado Springs, Colorado. She was the wife of cellist Günther Johannes Paetsch and the mother to their seven children.

Early life
Priscilla McClure Johnson was born in Evanston, Illinois, United States, on 18 November 1931. Her parents were Harry McClure Johnson (1886–1932), a prominent Chicago attorney, and Helena Modjeska Chase (1900–1986), an artist. She was the fifth child of Harry Johnson, who died on 29 March 1932 from a sudden attack of influenza, which developed into pneumonia, in Toronto, Ontario, Canada, where he was visiting his mother. He died when she was only four months old. Although she was reared all over the country, she considers Steamboat Springs, Colorado, the closest thing to a hometown because she spent her summers there on her mother's horse ranch, the Pine Springs Ranch. She is the youngest sister of Mansi McClure Johnson (1924–2013), Harry McClure Johnson (1925–2007), Elizabeth McIlvaine Johnson (1926–2017), and Sarah Jane McClure Johnson (1929–2013).

In 1946, at the age of 15, she wrote and illustrated with beautiful drawings of horses the children's book How the Eggplant Came to Be, which was written at her mother's Pine Springs Ranch in Steamboat Springs, Colorado, and published by Adventure Trails Publications.

Education
From 1946 until 1950, Priscilla McClure Johnson was educated at The Putney School in Vermont, which had an excellent Music Department, majoring in violin, chamber music, and orchestral playing. She continued her education at Bennington College in Vermont from 1950 – 1952 majoring in violin performance. At the University of Wyoming, she received a Bachelor of Arts degree (BA) with major in Violin, and in 1956 a Master of Arts degree (MA) with major in Music Composition, with highest donors.  She wrote her Thesis about "An Analysis of Strawinsky's Symphony in Three Movements" on 24 April 1956 and her Thesis about "Some Aspects of Bach's Technique in the Solo Violin Sonatas and Suites" on 1 May 1956. She also studied at the Aspen Institute of Music in Colorado from 1954 – 1955 and at the Detmold Musikhochschule in Germany in 1957.

She studied with Madame Eckstein, Frederic Balazs (1st violinist of the Maverick String Quartet of Woodstock, NY; conductor of the Tucson Sym. Orch), Fritz Rikko (Faculty of Putney School and Juilliard; cond. violinist, violist), Gideon Grau (Putney faculty), Orreo Pernel (Bennington Faculty; Primier Prix in Paris Conservatoire), Szymon Goldberg (Solo violinist in Europe and America, faculty of Aspen  Institute of Music, who she later sent her daughter, Michaela to study with at Yale University and Curtis Institute of Music), Claus Adam (cellist of the Juilliard String Quartet, who taught chamber music), George Finkle (cellist at the Maverick Theater in Woodstock, NY who taught cello and chamber music at Hickory Ridge School and Putney School and Bennington College), Tibor Varga, and David Oistrakh.

From 1954 - 1955 she was professor of violin, viola and chamber music at the University of Wyoming. From 1955 - 1956 she instructed violin, viola and chamber music at Colorado College (Colorado Springs, Colorado). She was Music Director of World Tour as a violinist and composer from 1956 - 1957 through the Putney Graduate School of Teacher Education.

World tour
In the winter of 1956 Priscilla's mother, who had put all of her 5 children through college decided to do something for herself: Take a tour of Europe. Priscilla, an expert horse trainer, worked all summer to get enough money to help her mother to go. Priscilla drove her mother from Colorado Springs to Vermont where graduate students from the Putney Graduate School of Teacher Education where getting ready for the tour. She was invited to go with them with scholarship on a ship to Europe. She was dressed in her cowboy shirt and cowboy hat and Levi's and leather tasseled jacket and boots. She had her fiddle and guitar and some of her scores ... and ... one skirt, in case she was invited to dinner or something. That is how she headed out for Europe. She just had her slicker and bedroll.

Through Gibraltar and Spain and Italy it was found out that she was the only one able to drive the truck at their disposal that had a 27 foot covered bed and a complicated gearing system. Their guide unfortunately abandoned everyone on the tour during Christmas with all their money - they eventually found him enjoying the nudist beaches in Palermo, Italy and got what money was left, back form him. She now had $500 and time on her hands she headed for Garmisch-Partenkirchen to visit a friend and the village of Absam where Jacob Stainer had lived and had built his superb violins some 300 years before. During this time she learned how to speak a number of languages, including Spanish and Italian, and almost fluent in German.

Günther
On February 21, 1957, the 26 year old American violinist Priscilla McClure Johnson found the fairy-tale village of Tübingen, Germany with cobblestone streets, half-timbered houses, huge weeping willow branches overhanging the Neckar river, a beautifully restored medieval center and an old castle that dominates the hillside. As she walked the streets she heard a trumpet practicing as if there was a concert that night. She knocked on the door and asked someone nearby (a young man named Dietrich) if there was a concert that evening. She was told that there was and he happened to have an extra ticket to it and offered it to her. After she had checked into the youth hostel and tidied up the best she could she met Dietrich and went to where the concert was to take place and proceeded to hang up her coat in the Green room. She noticed an old Klotz violin lying on a piano. She admired it, the owner said to try it so she looked for a quiet corner. She saw a man playing a cello facing the corner playing one part of a two-part piece. So she went behind and played the other part and they played to the end. When they finished he looked around and Priscilla saw for the first time the face of the young handsome 28 year old Günther Johannes Paetsch, the man from Germany who was to become her husband.

During the performance Priscilla sat in the audience between Dietrich, who happened to be Günther's best friend and a girl named Isolde, who was Günther's pianist and rather attached to the cellist. Priscilla was unaware of this and had eyes only for the handsome cellist with the eyes like stars. His playing was with flair and a tone with such musicality. she had never heard anything quite like it. Gunther spoke no English and Priscilla had only college German so the next day they played piano trios with Isolde for the entire day going through most of the literature just for the pleasure of it. They had fallen in love.

The next two years or so Priscilla did not return to United States immediately but traveled and met new people and learned new languages and when she ran out of money she would play concerts. But she always returned every half year to visit with Günther in Stuttgart (he had finished his studies and had by now been admitted into the bar). It was at this time that she walked to Iraq, learned Arabic and was caught up in the revolt there escaping unharmed.

In 1957 Priscilla McClure Johnson was invited to be a member of the international jury representing the United States in the International Stringed Instrument Competition held in Moscow, Russia. Maurice Maréchal represented France, Priscilla M. Johnson represented the United States, and representing Russia and the president of the jury was David Oistrakh.

Later she found herself in Norway and Finland, playing concert for the Sami people and walking up to Nordkapp, Norway in the dead of winter and nearly froze to death in the silent mountain passes where no vehicle could go. She had asked how far it is to Nordkapp and they told her it was about 4 miles, unaware that a Norwegian mile is about ten English miles.

For two and a half years between 1956–59 she went on a World Study Trip, sponsored by the Putney Graduate School of Teacher Education, traveling over all of Europe, on both sides of the Iron Curtain, to Africa and the Middle East, to study the Music and the Educational Systems in 30 different countries, visiting numerous Music Schools and Conservatories, and seeking knowledge of the Compositions of Contemporary Composers.

Priscilla insisted that if they were to be married he must at least see the country and the life style from which she grew up (she also trained Polish-bred registered Arabian horses in Colorado). He agreed to come to America if she married him. Even though he couldn't speak a word of english he set out for the United States and found an openness and freedom that he had not known and stayed. She brought him out to her mothers 'Pine Springs Ranch' in Steamboat Springs, Colorado in June 1959.

Children
Priscilla McClure Johnson married Günther Johannes Paetsch in Colorado Springs, CO on 24 May 1959  at the house of her mother. After their wedding, they went on a two-month honeymoon on the top the Continental divide the Colorado Rockies on three of her horses. One horse carried a pack of things they would need for the next 2 months. 

When Priscilla Paetsch was younger she wasn't really interested in children but that changed when she met Günther. When Priscilla was six she heard the Bach Brandenburg Concerto No. 3 for the first time and there and then made up her mind to become violinist so she could play that great work. This work actually requires nine individual players and it just happened that she met a cellist and they had seven children and they did play this work.

Priscilla Paetsch had seven children in eleven years (1960-1971). Her first child, Phebe Verena Paetsch was born in 1960 in Denver, CO. Michaela Modjeska Paetsch was born in 1961 in Colorado Springs, as was Brigitte McClure Paetsch in 1963, Johann Sebastian Paetsch in 1964, Christian Friedeman Paetsch in 1966, Engelbert Raphael Paetsch in 1968, and Siegmund Amedeus Paetsch in 1971. Not only were  Priscilla and Gunther professional musicians, but their 7 children (3 daughters and 4 sons) all learned to play string instruments as well. They would eventually form their own nine-piece group: The Paetsch Family Chamber Music Ensemble.  Five of the siblings are now professional musicians. Michaela, the second oldest, broke new ground by joining the Colorado Springs Symphony (now called the Colorado Springs Philharmonic) at the age of 13, making her the youngest member ever. At one time, there were five Paetsch family members playing alongside each other in the orchestra. Priscilla and her second oldest, Michaela, shared a music stand. Johann, the fourth oldest and oldest son, joined the Colorado Springs Symphony when he was 13 as the youngest cellist ever. Brigitte, the third child, also joined soon after to play in the violin section. Later Christian was to join.

Starting in 1967  Priscilla was professor of violin and viola and chamber music at the Cosmic Heights School of Music in Colorado Springs. She wrote; "During all these years from 1960 on, I also was the mother of seven children, born between concerts - I never missed a concert - who all became musicians, some of them world-class concert artists and soloists under my training."

When children, who look like angels also perform like angels, who possess all the skill necessary to tackle the heroic, Herculean, Brahms Sextet — when cascading technical passages are performed with effortless execution, and are matched by a lush tone and perfect intonation that make a syncopation, excitement, breath and brilliance, then we have a true greatness in our midst.

Priscilla is qualified to teach Violin, String Classes, Chamber Music, Conduct, and instruct Composition and Theory Classes. From 1960 – 1961 she was music director of the Arvada Symphony (CO) and stringed instrument teacher in R-1 School District in Arvada, Colorado. Later she taught violin and chamber music at the Pine Spring Ranch School of Music, where she was coach and violinist in the Paetsch - Fodor Chamber Music Ensemble in Steamboat Springs, CO. Extremely gifted young musicians such as John Fodor and his brother Eugene Fodor, outstanding in their ability and accomplishment, studied during the summers at the Paetsch Music camp at Pines Spring Ranch in Steamboat Springs, CO where they had private instruction and study as a string ensemble and learn music theory from Mr. and Mrs. Paetsch.

Compositions
Priscilla Paetsch was first violinist with the Colorado Springs Symphony and a recognized composer. She has composed since the early age of 12 when she brought a composition to school that she wrote for 2 violins.  The well known musician and teacher, Norwood Hinkle was the first to  train her in music theory at The Putney School in  Vermont. Her formal composition training she received at Bennington College with the 12-tone composer, Leonel Novak. Followed by training at the University of Wyoming with Allan A. Willman, who happened to be a protege of Nadia Boulanger. Priscilla received her Master's Degree in Composition at the University of Wyoming. Her compositions have been performed not only in Colorado Springs, but in the Eastern United States, Europe and Russia where her symphony was acclaimed when she appeared there representing the U.S. as judge of the International Stringed Instrument Competitions

Priscilla's compositions include:
 Composition for 2 violins (1943) 
 Symphony No. 1 
 String Quartets
 String Trio
 Sonata in D Major (1960)  
 Sonata for Violin and Piano
 Rondo for Violin and Piano
 Caprice for Solo Violin
 Four Voiced Choral Fugue 
In 1978 she was awarded "Best Violin Teacher of the Year" by the American String Teachers Association (ASTA).

Horses
 A member of the Arabian Horse Registry of American, Priscilla Paetsch raised, bred and trained Polish-bred registered Arabian horses. She used to jump her Arabian horses in competition winning many prizes. She shoes her own horses on the small plot of land her family owns on the west side of Colorado Springs. She taught all of her 7 children to be able to ride horses before they could walk. The family would ride for pleasure behind their house which, was the Rocky Mountain National Park. At one time she had 11 purebred Arabian horses at their house in Colorado Springs.

Priscilla Paetsch (sometime referred to as Mrs. Gunther Paetsch) not only trained and raised Purebred Arabian horses but she participated in many shows like the 1965 Broadmoor Arabian Show. In this show she modeled native Bedouin costumes similar to those worn in the deserts of Arabia the only thing different is that in Arabia, horses were kept for war purposes (soundness, speed, stamina, endurance and intelligence) and only men were allowed to ride them. The woman were confined to camels. At the same time she was also an artist, her paintings of horses, like the one called “the parents of her horse Zunet” inspired others to request her to design programs and high point trophy buckles and posters.

She was ahead of the times, and as many people were schooled in a very formal environment where it was only proper to call the elders by the last names, she wanted to be called Priscilla.

References

1931 births
2017 deaths
Musicians from Colorado
Musicians from Illinois
Composers for violin
Women classical violinists
21st-century American composers
American female horse trainers
People from Steamboat Springs, Colorado
The Putney School alumni
21st-century American women musicians
21st-century American violinists
21st-century women composers